The Renville County Courthouse in Mohall, North Dakota was built from 1936 to 1937 and dedicated in June 1937.  The building was designed in the Moderne style by architect E. W. Molander.  The construction was partially funded by the Works Progress Administration and overseen by general contractor Iver Orheim.  It was listed on the National Register of Historic Places in 1985.

The front facade is made of brick with Kettle River sandstone on the parapet.  The name "Memorial Court House" is engraved in a frieze above the front entrance.  Of nine county courthouses built in North Dakota during 1929–1940, it is the one having Moderne rather than Art Deco styling.

References

Courthouses on the National Register of Historic Places in North Dakota
County courthouses in North Dakota
Streamline Moderne architecture in the United States
Government buildings completed in 1936
National Register of Historic Places in Renville County, North Dakota
Works Progress Administration in North Dakota
1936 establishments in North Dakota